Alexei Navalny (born 1976) is the Russian opposition leader and lawyer.

Navalny may also refer to:

 Navalny 35, a group of citizens of Russia involved in the poisoning and imprisonment of Alexei Navalny
 Navalny (film), a 2022 documentary film

See also

 
 Navalnyy v. Russia, a human rights case